USS Sea Foam is a name used more than once by the U.S. Navy:

 , an American Civil War brig assigned to a mortar flotilla.
 , commissioned at Pearl Harbor on 15 May 1945.

United States Navy ship names